The 1906–07 Bradford City A.F.C. season was the fourth in the club's history.

The club finished 5th in Division Two, and reached the 3rd round of the FA Cup.

During the season there was talk of a merger with city rivals Bradford (Park Avenue). A meeting was held on 28 May 1907, with the proposal being rejected by 1,031 votes against to 487 for.

Sources

References

Bradford City A.F.C. seasons
Bradford City